Argentina sent competitors to the 2018 Winter Paralympics in Pyeongchang, South Korea.  The people were Carles Codina and Enrique Plantey. Codina competed in para-snowboarding. Plantey competed in para-alpine skiing.

Team 
Argentina sent two people to  Pyeongchang, South Korea.  They were Carles Codina and Enrique Plantey. Codina competed in para-snowboarding. Plantey competed in para-alpine skiing.

The table below contains the list of members of people (called "Team Argentina") that will be participating in the 2018 Games.

Results

Alpine skiing 
For the super combined event, the first run is the super-G and the second run is the slalom.

Men

Snowboarding 

Banked slalom

Snowboard cross

References 

Nations at the 2018 Winter Paralympics
2018
Paralympics